Fort St. John (Charlie Lake) Water Aerodrome  is located  northwest of Fort St. John, British Columbia, Canada.

See also
Fort St. John Airport
Fort St. John/Tompkins Mile 54 Airport

References

Seaplane bases in British Columbia
Peace River Regional District
Registered aerodromes in British Columbia